General Council elections were held in Guinea in December 1946 and 5 January 1947.

Electoral system
The 40-member General Council was elected by groups; the First College (French citizens) elected 16 members and the Second College elected 24 members.

Results

References

Guinea
Guinea
1946 in French Guinea
1947 in French Guinea
1946 3
Election and referendum articles with incomplete results